Nitchevo may refer to:

 Nitchevo (1926 film), a French silent film
 Nitchevo (1936 film), a French sound remake